Ela Velden (born Daniela Campos Reséndiz 25 July 1992 in Querétaro, Querétaro, Mexico), is a Mexican actress and model. In October 2014, she made her telenovela debut co-starring in producer Pedro Damián's remake, Muchacha italiana viene a casarse. In 2016, she starred as the lead role in Despertar contigo.

Early life
Daniela Campos Reséndiz was born in Querétaro. She has a sister. She began modeling at 13 and appeared in commercials, editorials, and fashion shows as a teenager. She also appeared in ads for Garnier's "100% de color" campaign alongside singer Dulce Maria in 2010. When she was 18 years old, she left Querétaro and settled in Mexico City where she studied at Televisa's acting school, Centro de Educación Artística from 2011 to 2013. She appeared in several school productions and graduated after completing a three-year course in 2013. Her artistic name was chosen after she unsuccessfully attempted to register as an actress under her birth name.

Acting career
In 2013, Velden debuted as an actress in the Mexican television series, Gossip Girl: Acapulco. Originally, she was cast as "Jenny Parra" and filmed a promotional trailer for the show, but when the role was recast, she later appeared in a recurring role as "Gaby".  The show was filmed on location in Acapulco, Mexico from January to May 2013. It premiered exclusively on the subscription channel, Golden Premier, in Mexico on August 5, 2013. The show was canceled after one season.
Following the conclusion of Gossip Girl: Acapulco, she filmed an appearance on the teen-oriented telenovela, Niñas Mal 2 for MTV Latin America. She also participated in several episodes of the Mexican television drama series, Como dice el dicho, in the spring and summer of 2014.

In May 2014, Velden auditioned in Mexico City for a role in producer Pedro Damián's latest telenovela remake, Muchacha italiana viene a casarse.  The telenovela is based on the popular 1971 Mexican telenovela of the same name. In July of that same year, she was announced as one of the actors in the final considerations for a role in the telenovela. In August, Velden's participation in Muchacha italiana viene a casarse was officially confirmed. This is her debut role in a telenovela. Prior to production, she studied Italian for six months in order to more accurately portray her character.  Filming began on August 25, 2014 where she and some of the cast traveled to Maratea, Italy and filmed scenes and promotional material for two weeks. Scenes for the finale were filmed in Maratea and Naples, Italy, where production was completed in mid-May 2015. The telenovela aired weekdays on Canal de las Estrellas, following its premiere on October 20, 2014. Its final episode aired on June 21, 2015 in Mexico.

2015 to present
On May 28, 2015, Velden made her theater debut as "Susana" in the original production, "Gélidas Caricias". The drama also starred Jorge Gallegos, Jade Fraser and Nicole Vale who both alternated as "Susana". The play premiered on May 21, 2015 in Mexico City at Teatro en Corto. It ran every week until June 28, 2015. Beginning on July 19, 2015 until late August 2015, Velden appeared in the play, "El Profesor" alongside Damián Alcázar. The play was performed at Foro Cultural Chapultepec in Mexico City. Later, the cast embarked on a small theater tour throughout Mexico in August 2015. She also appeared in the comedy play, "Tenis", an adaptation of the highly successful Argentine version. The play premiered at La Teatrería in Mexico City on September 17, 2015 and ran until November 19, 2015. She had a role in the telenovela drama,  A que no me dejas, in the program's second season. The telenovela began airing its second season on November 3, 2015 on Canal de las Estrellas.

For her work in Muchacha italiana viene a casarse, Velden received the award for "Mejor Actriz Revelación" (Best Female Revelation) at the 2016 Premios TV y Novelas award show, held in Acapulco on April 17, 2016. On May 14, 2016, Velden was announced as the lead actress for producer Pedro Damián's latest telenovela, Despertar contigo.  Despertar contigo premiered on Canal de las Estrellas on August 8, 2016 and aired weeknights. It later premiered in the U.S. on Univision on August 30, 2016 where it aired weeknights.
2020 she appears in 6 episodes as Lupe who is a diablera in Diablero second season, a Mexican serie from Netflix.

Personal life
Velden was in relationship with Argentine actor Federico Ayos from 2017-2018. In late 2018, she confirmed on Instagram to be in a relationship with actor Emiliano Zurita.

Filmography

Television roles

Music videos

Awards and nominations

References

External links

 PR Agency Roster 
 Talent Agency Profile

1992 births
Living people
Mexican television actresses
Mexican telenovela actresses
Actresses from Querétaro
People from Querétaro City
Mexican female models
21st-century Mexican actresses